KOFR-LP (107.1 FM) is a low-power FM radio station broadcasting a Religious format. Licensed to Lander, Wyoming, US, the station is currently owned by Church of the Holy Rosary.

References

External links
 

OFR-LP
Radio stations established in 2015
2015 establishments in Wyoming
OFR-LP
Catholic radio stations
Catholic Church in Wyoming
Lander, Wyoming